James Kevin McGuinness (December 20, 1894 – December 4, 1950) was an American screenwriter and film producer. He wrote for 36 films between 1927 and 1950. He wrote for The New Yorker magazine. He was born in Ireland and immigrated to New York in 1904. He arrived in Los Angeles in the 1920s at the dawn of the "talkies" era and thereafter worked in the film industry as a writer and later a producer. He later became chief supervisor and executive producer at Metro-Goldwyn-Mayer. He died in New York in 1950 from a heart attack.

Selected filmography

Slaves of Beauty (1927)
A Girl in Every Port (1928)
Woman Wise (1928)
Strong Boy (1929)
The Woman from Hell (1929)
The Black Watch (1929)
Born Reckless (1930)
Men Without Women (1930)
Under Suspicion (1930)
West of Broadway (1931)
Attorney for the Defense (1932)
 This Sporting Age (1932)
 When Strangers Marry (1933)
Viva Villa! (1934)
A Night at the Opera (1935)
Madame X (1937)
The Battle of Midway (1942)
Rio Grande (1950)

Bibliography

Articles

 Jack Dempsey.

List of poems

References

External links

1894 births
1950 deaths
Irish emigrants to the United States (before 1923)
American male screenwriters
American film producers
The New Yorker people
Place of birth missing
20th-century American male writers
20th-century American screenwriters